Georgi Georgiev-Gogo (born November 5, 1971) is a Bulgarian actor. He is best known for his voice-over roles in famous television series like JAG, Ally McBeal, That '70s Show, Farscape, Sliders, Dharma & Greg and CSI: NY.

Acting career
He had a small role in the movie Orkestar bez ime and appeared in the television series She and he. He has also appeared in commercials for M-Tel and Multirama.

Voice acting career
Gogo started his voice-over career in the late 1990s. His first series was Early Edition for Nova Television. Other series he has dubbed into Bulgarian include Highlander: The Series (second dub), Two Guys and a Girl, Law & Order: Criminal Intent, Studio 60 on the Sunset Strip and Heroes (from season three onwards) as well as animated series like Justice League and Duck Dodgers.

Personal life
He is married and has two sons. His mother is Keva Apostolova, the chief editor of Theatre magazine and his father is actor Georgi G. Georgiev.

References

External links
 Georgi Georgiev-Gogo at Bgactors

1971 births
Living people
Bulgarian male voice actors
Bulgarian male stage actors
Bulgarian male television actors
Male actors from Sofia
20th-century Bulgarian male actors
21st-century Bulgarian male actors
Male child actors
European child actors